Pavel Drtíl (born 18 February 1973) is a Czech professional soft-tip and steel-tip darts player who played in World Darts Federation (WDF), Professional Darts Corporation (PDC) and soft-tip international events. Two-time gold medalist in singles competitions at the EDU European Darts Championship. He also represented his country at the PDC World Cup of Darts, WDF World Cup and WDF Europe Cup.

Career
Since 2006, Drtíl has participated four times in the Winmau World Masters. The best result was recorded in 2012, when he advanced to the third round. He recorded his first significant success during the EDU European Darts Championship in 2010, when he won a gold medal in single cricket competition. On his way to the final, he defeated Boris Krčmar and in the final match he beat Kurt van de Rijck.

In 2010, he was invited to participate in the 2010 PDC World Cup of Darts as a Czech Republic representative together with Martin Kapucian. Unfortunately, due to unfavorable weather conditions in Prague, they were unable to get to the tournament in England. He got another chance to play in the Professional Darts Corporation tournament during 2016 PDC World Cup of Darts. This time he represented his country together with Michal Kočík. They ended their participation in the first round, lost to Yuanjun Liu and Wenge Xie from China, by 3–5 in legs. In 2016, he won another medal at the EDU European Darts Championship in cricket singles competition. In 2018, he won the gold medal in the singles competition, defeated El Abbas El Amri in the final match.

In the following years, he took part in the qualifiers for the PDC European Tour tournaments several times, but without success.

Performance timeline

References

1973 births
Living people
People from Trutnov
Czech darts players
PDC World Cup of Darts Czech team